Zina-Zinulya is a 1986 Soviet drama film directed by Pavel Chukhray.

Plot 
The film tells about a girl who is faced with fraud and trying to confront him.

Cast 
 Evgeniya Glushenko as Zinaida Koptyaeva
 Viktor Pavlov as Petrenko
 Vladimir Gostyukhin as Viktor Nikolaevich
 Aleksandr Zbruev as Fedor Ivanovich Kuzmin
 Tatyana Agafonova as Valya Nikitina
 Elena Mayorova as Nina (as Yelena Majorova)
 Svetlana Tormakhova as Klava
 Evgeniy Shutov as Sergey Sergeevich
 Nina Agapova as Secretary
 Valentina Ananina as Dorm janitor

References

External links 
 

1986 films
1980s Russian-language films
Soviet drama films
1986 drama films